Victorian Bitter Gold is a mid strength Lager with an alcohol volume of 3.0% created in 2007 by Foster's. Originally branded as 'VB Midstrength Lager', Victorian Bitter Gold was created in order to capitalise on the growing market for mid strength beers, currently dominated by XXXX Gold. Victorian Bitter Gold rebranded from 'VB Mid strength' in 2009 and sells over one million cases every year and has grown strongly in popularity following its launch in late 2007. Originally brewed at 3.5% the alcohol volume has since been reduced to 3.0%.

TV builder Scott Cam, a self-confessed Victorian Bitter fan, is the appointed Victorian Bitter Mid Ambassador.

On 24 July 2007, The Australian reported that within three months of Fosters launching Victorian Bitter Gold, market shares for the full strength Victorian Bitter and Victorian Bitter Gold had increased. Foster's regional marketing director Anthony Heraghty hinted at further Victorian Bitter brand extensions, saying Foster's was "trying to see past the big green giant".

During the 2008 Rugby League World Cup, Victorian Bitter Gold was advertised on TV by Australian Rugby League legends Wally Lewis and Gorden Tallis.

See also

Australian pub
Beer in Australia
List of breweries in Australia

References

Australian beer brands
Foster's Group
Asahi Breweries